The Design History Society is an arts history organisation founded in 1977 to promote and support the study and understanding of design history. The Society undertakes a range of charitable activities intended to encourage and support research and scholarship, to offer information and create networking opportunities, to foster student participation and public recognition of the subject, and to support regional links and events. The Society welcomes members from related disciplines such as anthropology, architecture and art history, business history, the history of science and technology, craft history, cultural studies, economic and social history, design and design management studies. An elected Executive Committee and Board of Trustees works to enable the activities of the Society, and to ensure that design history is appropriately represented in higher education and research bodies in the UK.

Journal 
The Journal of Design History is published quarterly by Oxford University Press on behalf of the Design History Society (J Design Hist, web , print ). It is the leading journal in its field, and plays an active role in the development of design history, including the history of crafts and applied arts, as well as contributing to the broader fields of visual and material culture studies. The journal includes a regular book reviews section and lists books received, and from time to time publishes special issues.

Conference 
The annual DHS Conference provides an international platform for interdisciplinary approaches to research and critical debate in design history. Hosted each year by a different partner institution, the conference aims to further global dialogues on design and its histories. See Past Conferences below.

Funding 

 A range of annual Research Grants encourage debate and research in design history.  Individual grants are awarded to support particular research activities, including exhibitions, publication costs, travel and conference attendance, and scholarship in non-Western, post-colonial and other underrepresented areas of research.
 The Day Symposium Grant supports DHS members who wish to discuss and disseminate new design history research by convening a one-day symposium.
 The Outreach Grant assists DHS members convening a public event to promote design history beyond a traditional academic setting.
 Student members benefit from a Student Travel Award and DHS Conference Bursary scheme.

Prizes 

 Launched in 2017, the Design Writing Prize recognises outstanding writing that engages academic and non-academic audiences in critical and contemporary issues in design.
 The Student Essay Prize, established in 1997, is awarded to one undergraduate and one postgraduate essay each year to celebrate excellence in student writing in design history.

Events 
In 2018, the DHS launched a rolling calendar of events and activities convened by trustees working with relevant educational, professional and cultural partners.  These events create opportunities for engagement beyond the annual conference, support teaching and learning at all levels of design historical education, and aim to reach audiences, both internationally and across the UK.

Membership 
Design History Society members include all those interested in design: students, designers, lecturers, historians, researchers, craftspeople, manufacturers, archivists, curators, librarians and collectors. The Society offers membership rates for individuals and institutional members. A concessionary rate is also available for students, full and part-time, the unwaged and seniors. Membership under all categories is administered by Oxford University Press.

Past Conferences

References

External links
https://www.designhistorysociety.org/

Design institutions
Arts organizations established in 1977
History organisations based in the United Kingdom